Fairland is an unincorporated community in Douglas county, Illinois, United States. Fairland is located along a disused railroad line east of Villa Grove.

References

Unincorporated communities in Douglas County, Illinois
Unincorporated communities in Illinois